Bhurji may refer to:

 Egg bhurji, an Indian egg dish
 Bharbhunja (Hindu), an Indian caste
 Bhurji Khan, Indian vocalist

See also
Burji (disambiguation)